The Premier Hockey Federation (PHF), formerly the National Women's Hockey League (NWHL), is a women's professional ice hockey league located in the United States and Canada. The league was established in 2015 with four league-owned teams and has since grown to a mixture of seven independently owned teams: the Boston Pride, Buffalo Beauts, Connecticut Whale, Metropolitan Riveters, Minnesota Whitecaps, Montreal Force and Toronto Six.

The Isobel Cup, the league's championship trophy, is awarded annually to the league playoff champion at the end of each season.

History

League beginnings and inaugural 2015–16 season
The National Women's Hockey League (NWHL) was formed by Dani Rylan in March 2015 with an estimated $2.5 million operating budget. It was the first women's professional hockey league to pay its players. Prior to the league's formation, the only choice for top level women's hockey in North America was the Canadian Women's Hockey League (CWHL), which at the time paid bonuses and incentives but not salaries. The league's inaugural season ran on a salary cap of US$270,000 maximum per team and a $10,000 minimum per player. The players also earn 15% of profits from any NWHL jersey sold with their name on it. The league placed its four original teams in markets where many young girls play ice hockey: the New York City area, Buffalo, and New England.

Commissioner Dani Rylan had not disclosed the league's initial investors or how much had been invested. Canadian Joel Leonoff, CEO of Paysafe Group and father of Connecticut Whale goaltender Jaimie Leonoff, has spoken about his investment in the league, although he declined to reveal the size of his investment.

The inaugural NWHL Draft took place in Boston in June 2015 with each team selecting five collegiate athletes. The league held tryout camps in various locales in Canada, along with an international player camp in Boston. The league attracted many top level United States women's national ice hockey team stars from the CWHL such as Hilary Knight and former Team USA captain Meghan Duggan, top graduating players from the NCAA, and international players.

In December 2015, the league signed their first league-wide sponsorship deal, a multi-year deal with Dunkin' Donuts. On December 31, 2015, the Boston Pride played Montreal's Les Canadiennes of the CWHL to a 1–1 tie in the first Women's Winter Classic (officially the "Outdoor Women's Classic presented by Scotiabank") the day before the 2016 NHL Winter Classic and at the same site, Gillette Stadium in Foxborough, Massachusetts. It was the first outdoor professional women's hockey game and the first game between the NWHL and the CWHL.

The 1st NWHL All-Star Game took place on January 24, 2016, in Buffalo, New York. The game featured a 4-on-4 format with Hilary Knight of the Boston Pride and Emily Pfalzer of the Buffalo Beauts serving as team captains. On Saturday, March 12, 2016, the Boston Pride became the first Isobel Cup champions with a 3–1 win over the Buffalo Beauts and a 2–0 series win.

Structural changes and NHL partnerships (2016–2019)
On August 4, 2016, the league announced that all four inaugural season jersey designs would be retired and replaced with new uniform designs that were voted upon by fans. Two days prior to this announcement, the league announced a partnership with You Can Play, an organization dedicated to eradicating homophobia in sport. Not only did each team in the league have a You Can Play athlete-ambassador, it would eventually begin to develop a policy with regards to transgender players. This initiative took place in response to the October 7, 2016, announcement that Buffalo Beauts player Harrison Browne was transgender (and the first openly transgender athlete in professional American team sports).

Part way into the league's second season, the NWHL informed its players on November 17, 2016, that they would receive up to a 50% pay cut. This decreased the league player minimums to $5,000 per player. Five weeks later, in an attempt to partially compensate for the salary rollback, the league introduced an incentive program where players from the home team split the revenue generated by tickets sold in excess of 500 after each game. On February 3, 2017, the league announced that the season and playoffs would be shortened to accommodate for the players' participation in the 2017 IIHF World Championships and preparations for the 2018 Olympic teams. In September 2017, the league joined with 16 other international hockey organizations in formally adopting the NHL's Declaration of Principles, with the goal of advancing teaching, policies, and programs to strengthen hockey communities around the world.

In October 2017, the New Jersey Devils of the National Hockey League (NHL) partnered with the Riveters, the first NHL team to partner with an NWHL team. The three-year partnership provides facilities for Riveters games and practices, and assists with sponsorships, marketing, and tickets. The team changed its name to the Metropolitan Riveters and adopted the colors of the Devils. Some Riveters games are broadcast on The One Jersey Network, the Devils' digital radio station as well. As part of the new affiliation, the Riveters and Devils held a doubleheader at the Prudential Center for the Riveters' 2017–18 season opener against the Boston Pride followed by the Devils' game against the Arizona Coyotes.

On December 21, 2017, the Buffalo Beauts were acquired by Pegula Sports and Entertainment, owners of the Buffalo Sabres, Rochester Americans, and the Beauts' arena HarborCenter. The Beauts were the second team to become affiliated with an NHL franchise, following the Metropolitan Riveters and the New Jersey Devils partnership in October, the first NWHL franchise to not be owned by the league and the first team in professional women's hockey to be owned by a National Hockey League owner.

On May 15, 2018, the league announced its first expansion franchise, the Minnesota Whitecaps, would join the league for the 2018–19 season. The Whitecaps played in the Western Women's Hockey League (WWHL) in Canada from 2004 to 2011. Following the WWHL's closure, the team played as an independent, playing against college teams and in exhibition games against NWHL teams during the inaugural 2015–16 season. The Whitecaps signed a partnership agreement with the Minnesota Wild, with whom the Whitecaps already had cooperated with as an independent, in the 2018 offseason. The Whitecaps were the second franchise to be privately operated in the NWHL.

In August 2018, the NWHL also began an affiliation program, called the Jr. NWHL, with youth hockey organizations to promote growth in girl's and women's hockey.

After a call for more transparency the league announced they would reveal some of the league investors and their stories over the 2018–19 season. The first league investor to be revealed was Neil Leibman, co-owner of the Texas Rangers of Major League Baseball. The second was announced as Lee Heffernan, a marketing executive.

In January 2019, the Boston Pride and the NHL's Boston Bruins officially became promotional partners, making the Pride the fourth NWHL team associated with an NHL team. During the 2018–19 season, commissioner Rylan stated that the Minnesota Whitecaps were the first NWHL team to turn a profit.

CWHL dissolution aftermath (2019–2021)
On March 31, 2019, it was announced that the Canadian Women's Hockey League board of directors had decided that the league would discontinue operations effective May 1, 2019. The Toronto Furies and Les Canadiennes organizations announced they intended to continue operations while the Calgary Inferno announced an intention to do everything in its power to continue women's hockey in Alberta. During the season, NWHL commissioner Dani Rylan had been in talks with the CWHL about the possibility of a single league. In response to the abrupt folding of the CWHL, The Athletic reported that the NWHL was exploring adding teams in Canada to fill the markets left by the CWHL, likely adding Toronto and Montreal teams with the possibility of adding Calgary if a major donor could help with the costs.

On April 2, 2019, the NWHL announced plans for two expansion franchises in Montreal and Toronto and official support from the National Hockey League to make it one of the NWHL's biggest financial sponsors. The league was in conversations with all of the current stakeholders and partners within Toronto and Montreal. However, in response to the folding of the CWHL, players from both leagues were dissatisfied in the operation of both the NWHL and CWHL in that neither league provided health insurance or a livable salary. Due to these conditions, over 200 players released a joint statement announcing their intent to not participate in any North American professional league for the 2019–20 season. The NWHL responded with that they were pursuing many more sponsors than in previous years and hoped to increase player salaries. and agreed to give players a 50 percent split of revenue on league sponsorship and media deals. On May 20, 2019, the players formed a worker's union called the Professional Women's Hockey Players Association (PWHPA) to further push for their stated goals of a league that provides financial and infrastructure resources to players, health insurance, and support to training programs for young female players.

On May 8, 2019, Pegula Sports and Entertainment, the owners of the Buffalo Beauts, relinquished ownership and operations of the team back to the NWHL, but continued to claim rights to the Beauts name as part of the turnover. On May 17, 2019, it was reported that the New Jersey Devils were ending their partnership with the Riveters. With the partnerships dissolved, both teams changed their home venues.

In a league update on May 30, 2019, the NWHL announced that due to no additional investors, the league would not be able to increase to full-time salaries or provide players with health insurance outside of the typical worker's compensation for injuries, but had come to an agreement to a 50 percent revenue split on all league-wide sponsorship and media deals. In addition, the league also stated they would not add Montreal and Toronto for the 2019–20 season. The league announced a longer 2019–20 season for the teams, going from 16 to 24 games. In September 2019, the Boston Pride were purchased by a group of investors led by Miles Arnone. On April 22, 2020, the NWHL announced an expansion team for Toronto, Ontario, to begin play in the 2020–21 season later named the Toronto Six. Johanna Neilson Boynton was announced as the owner of the team, Tyler Tumminia as the team chairman, and Digit Murphy as team president. The team replaced the former Toronto Furies of the former CWHL in the market.

On October 12, 2020, commissioner and founder Dani Rylan stepped down as commissioner and was replaced by Tyler Tumminia as interim commissioner. In addition, the league changed its governing model to an incorporated association that is overseen by a board of governors with one representative per team. Rylan remained with the league to oversee the Beauts, Whale, Riveters, and Whitecaps while searching for independent ownership of the league operated teams until March 2021 when she also left that role.

In 2020 and 2021, the NWHL was criticized for producing content in association with Barstool Sports, a sports website which had previously been accused of promoting racist and misogynistic views. In response, the NWHL distanced itself from the outlet, after Barstool's CEO Erika Nardini posted a video allegedly encouraging the harassment of journalists who criticized the partnership.

Premier Hockey Federation (2021–present)
Ahead of the 2021–22 season, Tumminia announced that team salary caps would be doubled, going from $150,000 per team to $300,000. On May 10, 2021, the league announced it had sold the Connecticut Whale to a new independent ownership group called Shared Hockey Enterprises (SHE), LLC, led by Tobin Kelly, reducing the league operated teams to three. On May 26, the league announced the Riveters had been sold to BTM Partners, owners of the Boston Pride and Toronto Six, with John Boynton named the team's chairman. The NWHL finished selling its league operated teams to independent ownership with the sale of the Buffalo Beauts and Minnesota Whitecaps to a joint partnership of NLTT Ventures, LLC, and Top Tier Sports on June 28, 2021.

In September 2021, the league officially rebranded as the Premier Hockey Federation, alongside several structural changes including prioritizing private ownership of teams. The 2021–22 season, the league's first season under the PHF title, began in November 2021. PHF players were required to follow testing and quarantine protocols due the outbreak of the COVID-19 Omicron variant.

On January 18, 2022, the league announced that 2022–23 salary cap would more than double to $750,000 per team, as well as full healthcare benefits and an equity stake in the teams for the players. Additionally, the league confirmed that it still plans to add the expansion team in Montreal and possibly additional locations in the United States.

In February 2022, it was announced that commissioner Tumminia was not seeking to renew her contract and would step down at the end of the 2021–22 season.

On July 12, 2022, the league officially announced the expansion franchise in Montreal to begin play in the 2022-2023 season. The Montreal team is owned by BTM Partners and Kevin Raphael will serve as the team's president.

In December 2022, the salary cap for the 2023–24 PHF season was set at $1.5 million per team, double the 2022–23 cap of $750,000. The increase aligns with the Board of Governors' pledge, made in 2021, to invest $25 million directly in pay and benefits to PHF players over the ensuing three seasons. The PHF salary cap had already grown dramatically over the prior seasons, beginning at $150,000 per team during the 2021 season, then doubling to $300,000 during the 2021–22 season, and more than doubling to $750,000 for the 2022–23 season; the league also began providing full health-care benefits to players in the 2022–23 season. The announced cap signifies a nine-hundred percent growth over the 2021 salary cap.

Teams

Current teams

Seasons

2015–16

The inaugural NWHL Draft took place in Boston on June 20, with each team selecting five collegiate players. The draft order was decided on June 8 by lottery: the New York Riveters to pick first, followed by the Connecticut Whale, the Boston Pride, and the Buffalo Beauts. The first overall pick by the Riveters was Boston College graduate Alex Carpenter, the 2015 winner of the Patty Kazmaier Award for the most outstanding player in NCAA women's hockey, and the daughter of National Hockey League All-Star Bobby Carpenter.

The first game in league history occurred on October 11, 2015, a sell-out match between the New York Riveters and Connecticut Whale. Manon Rhéaume dropped the puck in the ceremonial opening faceoff before the game. The first goal in league history was scored by Jessica Koizumi of the Connecticut Whale during the team's 4–1 win.

2016–17

The same four teams returned for the second season. Prior to the first game of the season, Harrison Browne of the Buffalo Beauts made the declaration that he was a transgender athlete. The 2nd NWHL All-Star Game was held in Pittsburgh, Pennsylvania, a rumored expansion market. Amanda Kessel and Kelley Steadman were named as All-Star captains. Kessel scored the first hat trick in NWHL All-Star history and was named Star of the Night by ESPN's SportsCenter. Brianna Decker finished the season as the league's top scorer and was named NWHL Most Valuable Player (MVP). The Buffalo Beauts, who finished in third place in the shortened season, upset the league-leading Boston Pride in the Isobel Cup, broadcast online by ABC News. The Beauts were honored at a Buffalo Sabres game later that month.

2017–18

The same four teams returned for the third season, all in the same primary home arenas for the first time. Buffalo played their home opener at Bill Gray's Regional Iceplex in the suburbs of Rochester and there was also one neutral-site game in Pittsburgh. The Metropolitan Riveters won the Isobel Cup defeating the Buffalo Beauts.

2018–19

The league expanded to five teams with the inclusion of the formerly independent Minnesota Whitecaps. The Champions Cup was played between the NWHL's 2018 Isobel Cup champion Metropolitan Riveters and the Swedish Women's Hockey League (SDHL) 2018 champion Luleå HF at Hobey Baker Memorial Rink in Princeton, New Jersey. Luleå defeated the Riveters 4–2. The Whitecaps won the Isobel Cup over the Buffalo Beauts in their first season in the league.

2019–20

The five teams from the previous season returned. Many former players boycotted the NWHL and formed the Professional Women's Hockey Players Association, leading to large roster turnover in the offseason. The game season was expanded from 16 to 24 games and a broadcast partnership was created with the Twitch streaming service. On Sunday, January 26, 2020, Jillian Dempsey became the first player in league history to reach 100 career points, including playoffs. She reached the century mark with an assist in a win versus the Minnesota Whitecaps. Prior to playing the championship game between the Boston Pride and Minnesota Whitecaps, the closure of public events during the COVID-19 pandemic led to the postponement and eventual cancellation of the championship. The 2020 Isobel Cup was not awarded.

2020–21 

The five teams from the previous season returned and an expansion team in the Toronto Six was added. Due to the on-going COVID-19 pandemic, the initial start of the regular season was pushed back to November 2020 and was to last until mid-March 2021 with 60 regular season games before the Isobel Cup playoffs. The start date was postponed again to January 2021 with each team playing five games, one against each team, before starting the Isobel Cup playoffs. All games are held at Herb Brooks Arena in Lake Placid, New York, and regular season games streamed live on Twitch. The semifinals and Isobel Cup championship game are scheduled to be aired on NBC Sports Network.

During the two-week season, the Riveters had to withdraw from participation after several members of the organization tested positive for COVID-19. Several days later, the Whale forfeited their final game and withdrew before the playoffs. The league suspended play one day before the playoffs were to begin. The league rescheduled the Isobel Cup playoffs for March 26 and 27 in Brighton, Massachusetts.

2021–22 

On April 28, 2021, the league announced that it was planning to double the salary cap of every franchise to $300,000, based on projections of financial stability for the seventh season.

Isobel Cup championship

The Isobel Cup, the league's championship trophy, is awarded annually to the league playoff champion at the end of each season. It is named after Lady Isobel Gathorne-Hardy, the daughter of Frederick Stanley, 16th Earl of Derby, the namesake of the Stanley Cup. The front of the trophy is engraved with "The Lady Isobel Gathorne-Hardy Cup 1875–1963. This Cup, shall be awarded annually to the greatest professional women's hockey team in North America. All who pursue this Cup, pursue a dream; a dream born with Isobel, that shall never die. EST. 2016." The Boston Pride won the inaugural championship in 2016. The Buffalo Beauts have earned the most appearances in an Isobel Cup Final with four straight appearances from 2016 to 2019, winning in 2017.

The 2020 Isobel Cup championship between the Boston Pride and Minnesota Whitecaps was originally postponed due to the COVID-19 pandemic, and was later canceled outright. The league announced that no champion would be named for the season.

Broadcasting
During the inaugural season, some games were shown on ESPN3. The league's flagship franchise, the Boston Pride, became the first women's hockey team to enter a regular broadcasting agreement with a regional sports network, with 8 of its 18 games presented on either NESN or NESNplus during the league's inaugural season. In 2016, third-party broadcasts moved from ESPN3 to Cheddar. On March 16, 2017, the league announced that ABC News' website would provide live streaming coverage of the 2017 Isobel Cup Playoffs.

On June 20, 2017, it was announced that the NWHL had made a deal with Twitter to live stream 16 regular season games, one game a week (billed as the "Twitter NWHL Game of the Week") plus the All Star Game and the NWHL/Team Russia Summit Series for the 2017–18 season. As part of the partnership with the New Jersey Devils in October 2017, some Riveters games are broadcast on The One Jersey Network, the Devils' digital radio station. The league also streamed and archived some games on its YouTube channel for free. The service is dubbed The Cross-Ice Pass. Some archived matches are also available.

On September 5, 2019, the NWHL announced a three-year deal with the video game-oriented streaming service Twitch to stream all games and league events on the platform. It marked the first NWHL broadcast deal to include a rights fee, and revenue will also be shared with players. The NWHL had also reached an agreement with NBCSN to carry the 2021 Isobel Cup semifinals and final, which would mark the first NWHL games to be broadcast nationally on a linear television channel.

On October 20, 2021, the PHF announced they will be exclusively streaming season 7 on ESPN+ in the U.S, with the 2022 Isobel Cup final airing on ESPN2.

See also

 PHF awards
 List of PHF records (individual)
 List of professional sports teams in the United States and Canada
 Major women's sport leagues in North America
 List of ice hockey leagues
 Women's sports

References

Further reading

External links

 

2015 establishments in New York (state)
Women's ice hockey leagues in the United States
Women's ice hockey leagues in Canada
 
Sports leagues established in 2015
Professional ice hockey leagues in the United States
Professional ice hockey leagues in Canada
Multi-national professional sports leagues
2015 establishments in the United States
2015 establishments in Canada